Åke Olsson (born 3 May 1934), is a Swedish chess player, two-times Swedish Chess Championship medalist (1962, 1966, 1969, 1971).

Biography
In 1952, Åke Olsson won Swedish Youth Chess Championship. In the 1960s and 1970s he was one of the leading Swedish chess players. In 1969, Åke Olsson shared 1st-3nd place with Ulf Andersson and Börje Jansson in Swedish Chess Championship, but lost in additional tournament. Also he won silver medal in this tournament in 1962, 1966 and 1971.

Åke Olsson played for Sweden in the Chess Olympiads:
 In 1962, at first reserve board in the 15th Chess Olympiad in Varna (+8, =2, -4),
 In 1968, at first reserve board in the 18th Chess Olympiad in Lugano (+6, =5, -3),
 In 1970, at second reserve board in the 19th Chess Olympiad in Siegen (+4, =2, -6),
 In 1972, at first reserve board in the 20th Chess Olympiad in Skopje (+3, =5, -5).

Åke Olsson played for Sweden in the World Student Team Chess Championship:
 In 1960, at second board in the 7th World Student Team Chess Championship in Leningrad (+3, =3, -7).

Åke Olsson played for Sweden in the Nordic Chess Cup:
 In 1970, at second board in the 1st Nordic Chess Cup in Großenbrode (+1, =2, -0) and won team silver and individual gold medals.

References

External links

Åke Olsson chess games at 365chess.com

1934 births
Living people
Swedish chess players
Chess Olympiad competitors